Douglas Edward Patey (born December 28, 1956) is a Canadian former ice hockey player. Patey played parts of three seasons with the Washington Capitals of the National Hockey League.

Born in Toronto, Ontario, Patey was drafted in 1976 by the Washington Capitals of the National Hockey League and the Phoenix Roadrunners of the World Hockey Association. Doug is the brother of Larry Patey.

External links

Profile at hockeydraftcentral.com

1956 births
Living people
Canadian ice hockey forwards
Cincinnati Stingers (CHL) players
Dayton Gems players
Hershey Bears players
Houston Apollos players
Ice hockey people from Toronto
Phoenix Roadrunners draft picks
SaPKo players
Sault Ste. Marie Greyhounds players
Washington Capitals draft picks
Washington Capitals players